Chil Naban (also Romanized as Chīl Nabān; also known as Chīl Banān) is a village in Mosaferabad Rural District, Rudkhaneh District, Rudan County, Hormozgan Province, Iran. At the 2006 census, its population was 83, in 17 families.

References 

Populated places in Rudan County